Bruce Irons (born November 16, 1979) is an American regularfoot professional surfer from Hanalei, Kauai and younger brother of three-time world champion Andy Irons.

Background and early years
Born in Hanalei, Kauai, he was raised on the North Shore where he began surfing at age seven. After a successful amateur career with several wins in the United States Surfing Championships, he went pro shortly after graduating high school.

Professional surfing career
After placing second place in 1998 and third in 2000, he defeated eleven-time world champion Kelly Slater to win the 2001 Billabong Pipeline Masters event. On October 3, 2004 after qualifying for the World championship tour, he again defeated the seven-time champion in the semifinals at the Association of Surfing Professionals Quiksilver Pro France event, but lost to his older brother Andy Irons in the final. Later, on December 15, 2004, he won the Quiksilver in Memory of Eddie Aikau event with a perfect score of 100, in waves that exceeded 40 feet (12m) at O'ahu's Waimea Bay. Soon after, he dazzled crowds by making the final and placing fourth in the Pipe Masters, barely re-qualifying for the 2005 tour.

On August 3, 2008 Irons defeated Freddy Patacchia to win the Rip Curl Pro Search 2008 held in Uluwatu, Bali, Indonesia. It was his first win on the ASP championship tour.

On November 21, 2012 Irons split with his longtime sponsor Volcom, where he'd been for nearly 20 years, helping shape the company's identity. On December 12, 2012 Irons signed a long-term deal with Fox Clothing. On November 30, 2015 Irons signed with RVCA after leaving Fox Clothing.

Non-surfing credits
Included in Irons' product endorsements are:
a signature pair of Oakley sunglasses
life sponsorship by the skate, surf, and snowboard clothing line, Volcom
one of three pro surfers, with Dane Reynolds and Ry Craike, supported by Power Balance
together with his brother, Andy, sponsorship by skate shoe company DC
wetsuit sponsor Body Glove International

In 2005, Irons starred in the Volcom funded autobiographical documentary film, entitled The Bruce Movie. The film was shot using 16mm, Super 8 and 35mm format and filmed on location in Hawaii, Indonesia, Australia, Tahiti, California, France and South Africa, and whilst popular in the surfing community, did not cut through to mainstream release. Irons was in the cast of the 2007 Australian documentary film about the Sydney surf gang, the Bra Boys, entitled Bra Boys: Blood is Thicker than Water. The film's official cast included eleven-time world champion, Kelly Slater, and surfing legends Mark Occhilupo, Irons, Laird Hamilton and approximately 40 other well known surfers.

Video game appearances
Irons is a playable character in the video game Kelly Slater's Pro Surfer.

Filmography 
Acting
Burning Man Dan 2 (2017)
 View from a Blue Moon (2015)
 Pipe (2011)
 Dude Cruse (2008)
 Blue Crush (2002)
Self 

 Além da Visão (2020)
 White Rhino (2019)
 Red Bull Sports Events (2018)
 Andy Irons: Kissed by God (2018)
 Who is J.O.B (2016)
 Peaking (2016)
 Heavy Water (2015)
  Immersion the Movie (2012)
 Pacific Pirates (2011)
 Fiberglass and Megapixels (2010)
Vans Triple Crown (2010)
 The Arena: North Short (2009)
 Archy: Build for Speed, Born to Ride (2008)
 Bra Boys (2007)
 Freddy P. Project: Interrogation (2006)
 Pipeline Masters Documentary (2006)
 The Kelly Slater Surf Invitational (2004)
 Blue Horizon (2004)
 Wow (2002)
 Bluetorch TV (2001)
 Gondwana (2001)
 Hit & Run (2000)

References

American surfers
1979 births
Living people
World Surf League surfers
People from Kauai County, Hawaii